Osteochilus harrisoni is a species of cyprinid fish endemic to northern Borneo.

Named in honor of Alfred C. Harrison, Jr. (1869-1925), explorer of Borneo and Sumatra, who collected type.

References

Taxa named by Henry Weed Fowler
Fish described in 1905
Osteochilus